Pierre-Jean-Baptiste Nougaret (16 December 1742, La Rochelle – 27 June 1823, Paris) was an 18th–19th-century French man of letters. He is the author of over one hundred forty volumes covering the most diverse subjects and in all genres: serious and facetious poems, dramas, parodies, historical compilations, political writings, collections of anas, epistolary novels, novels, memoirs. He is best known for his involvement with Nicolas Edme Restif de La Bretonne, whom he met on his arrival in Paris in 1766.

He died 27 June 1823 in Paris, at 4 rue d'Assas, aged eighty.

Works 
Among the multitude of works of this prolific poet, novelist, playwright, moralist and above all author of licentious books are:

written between 1758 and 1763: La famille en désordre, parody of Le Père de famille by Denis Diderot
1763–1766: Lucette ou les Progrès du libertinage, novel (Paris, 6 vol. in-18°)
1765: La Capucinade, very licenciouos novel, in-12°)
1769: Ainsi va le monde, ou les jolis péchés d’une marchande de mode, novel (Paris, in-12°, several reprints.)
1769: De l'art du théâtre en général (2 vol. in-12°)
1771: les Mille et une Folies, tales (Paris, 4 vol. in-12°)
1773: Almanach forain, ou les différens Spectacles des Boulevards et des Foires de Paris 1773
1775: Les Astuces de Paris, anecdotes parisiennes
1777: Le Vidangeur sensible, three-act drama
1777: La Paysanne pervertie, ou Mœurs des grandes villes
1777: Suzette et Perrin ou les Dangers du libertinage
1779: Les Faiblesses d'une jolie femme
1779: Éloge de Voltaire, poem
1781: Les Sottises et les Folies parisiennes
1785: Les Dangers de la sympathie : Lettres de Henriette de Belval, au Baron de Luzi, & de différentes personnes qui ont eu part aux principaux évènemens de sa vie
1787: Historiettes du jour, ou Paris tel qu'il est
1776–1791: Anecdotes du règne de Louis XVI, 6 vol. in-12°)
1797: Histoire des prisons de Paris et des départements, 4. vol. in-12°)
1802: Sémiramis, tragédie lyrique in three acts
1802: les Mœurs du temps, ou Mémoires de Rosalie de Terval, novel, 4 vol. in-12°)
1807: Histoire du donjon et du château de Vincennes, 3 vol. in-8°
1808: Anecdotes militaires de tous les peuples, 4 vol, in-8°)
1810: les Enfants célèbres, 2 vol. in-12°)
1811: Beautés de l’histoire d’Angleterre, in-12°), d’Allemagne 1812, in-12°), de Pologne 1814, in-12°), d’Espagne 1814°, in-12°), de Suède (1817), de Paris (1820, in-12°), du règne des Bourbons (1822, in-12°), de l’Histoire ecclésiastique 1822, in-12°), de l'histoire des États-Unis de l'Amérique Septentrionale1824, etc.

Bibliography

References

External links 
 List of his works on Gallica

18th-century French male writers
18th-century French dramatists and playwrights
19th-century French dramatists and playwrights
French erotica writers
18th-century French poets
19th-century French poets
Denis Diderot
People from La Rochelle
1742 births
1823 deaths